Senjamin Burić (born 20 November 1990) is a Bosnian professional handball player who plays for Skjern Håndbold and the Bosnia and Herzegovina national team.

He is the twin brother of Benjamin Burić.

References

External links

Living people
1990 births
Bosnia and Herzegovina male handball players
People from Doboj
Expatriate handball players
Bosnia and Herzegovina expatriate sportspeople in Croatia
Bosnia and Herzegovina expatriate sportspeople in France
Bosnia and Herzegovina expatriate sportspeople in Slovenia
RK Borac Banja Luka players
RK Zagreb players
Twin sportspeople
Bosnia and Herzegovina twins